James Maitland "Jimmy" Stewart (May 20, 1908 – July 2, 1997) was an American actor. Known for his distinctive drawl and everyman screen persona, Stewart's film career spanned 80 films from 1935 to 1991. With the strong morality he portrayed both on and off the screen, he epitomized the "American ideal" in the mid-twentieth century. In 1999, the American Film Institute (AFI) ranked him third on its list of the greatest American male actors. He received numerous honors including the Screen Actors Guild Life Achievement Award in 1968, the AFI Life Achievement Award in 1980, the Kennedy Center Honor in 1983, as well as the Academy Honorary Award, and Presidential Medal of Freedom, both in 1985.

Born and raised in Indiana, Pennsylvania, Stewart started acting while at Princeton University. After graduating in 1932, he began a career as a stage actor, appearing on Broadway and in summer stock productions. He landed his first supporting role in The Murder Man (1935), and had his breakthrough in Frank Capra's ensemble comedy You Can't Take It with You (1938). The following year, Stewart garnered his first of five Academy Award nominations for his portrayal of an idealized senator in Capra's Mr. Smith Goes to Washington (1939). The following year he received the Academy Award for Best Actor, the only competitive Oscar of his career, for his performance in the George Cukor romantic comedy The Philadelphia Story (1940). Stewart's first postwar role was as George Bailey in Capra's It's a Wonderful Life (1946). 

Although the film was not a major success upon release, he earned an Oscar nomination and the film has become a Christmas classic, as well as one of his best-known roles. As one of the most popular film stars of the '50s, Stewart played darker, more morally ambiguous characters in movies directed by Anthony Mann, including Winchester '73 (1950), The Glenn Miller Story (1954) and The Naked Spur (1953), and by Alfred Hitchcock in Rope (1948), Rear Window (1954), The Man Who Knew Too Much (1956), and Vertigo (1958). During this time he received Academy Award nominations for his roles in the comedy Harvey (1950) and the courtroom drama Anatomy of a Murder (1959). Stewart also starred in The Greatest Show on Earth (1952), The Spirit of St. Louis (1957), The Flight of the Phoenix (1965) as well as the Western films How the West Was Won (1962), The Man Who Shot Liberty Valance (1962), and Cheyenne Autumn (1964). He appeared in many popular family comedies during the 1960s.

Stewart remained unmarried until his 40s and was dubbed "The Great American Bachelor" by the press. In 1949, he married former model Gloria Hatrick McLean. They had twin daughters, and he adopted her two sons from her previous marriage. The marriage lasted until McLean's death in 1994; Stewart died of a pulmonary embolism three years later.

Early life

 
James Maitland Stewart was born on May 20, 1908, in Indiana, Pennsylvania, the eldest child and only son born to Elizabeth Ruth (née Jackson; 1875–1953) and Alexander Maitland Stewart (1872–1962). Stewart had two younger sisters, Mary (1912–1977) and Virginia (1914–1972). He was of Scottish and Scotch-Irish ancestry. The Stewart family had lived in Pennsylvania for many generations. Stewart's father ran the family business, the J.M. Stewart and Company Hardware Store, which he hoped Stewart would take over as an adult after attending Princeton University, as was the family tradition. Raised a Presbyterian by his deeply religious father, Stewart was a devout churchgoer for much of his life.

Stewart's mother was a pianist, and music was an important part of family life. When a customer at the store was unable to pay his bill, Stewart's father accepted an old accordion as payment. Stewart learned to play the instrument with the help of a local barber. His accordion became a fixture offstage during his acting career. A shy child, Stewart spent much of his time after school in the basement working on model airplanes, mechanical drawings and chemistry—all with a dream of going into aviation. He attended the Wilson Model School for primary school and junior high school. He was not a gifted student and received average to low grades. According to his teachers, this was not from a lack of intelligence, but due to being creative and having a tendency to daydream.

Stewart began attending Mercersburg Academy prep school in the fall of 1923, because his father did not believe he would be accepted into Princeton (his father was a member of the Class of 1898) if he attended public high school. At Mercersburg, Stewart participated in a variety of extracurricular activities. He was a member of the track team (competing as a high jumper under coach Jimmy Curran), the art editor of the school yearbook, a member of the glee club, and a member of the John Marshall Literary Society. To his disappointment, he was relegated to the third-tier football team due to his slender physique. Stewart also made his first onstage appearance at Mercersburg, as Buquet in the play The Wolves in 1928. During summer breaks, he returned to Indiana, working first as a brick loader and then as a magician's assistant. Due to scarlet fever that turned into a kidney infection, he had to take time out from school in 1927, which delayed his graduation until 1928. He remained passionate about aviation, with his interest enhanced by Charles Lindbergh's first solo transatlantic flight, but abandoned visions of becoming a pilot when his father steered him towards Princeton.

Stewart enrolled at Princeton in 1928 as a member of the class of 1932, majoring in architecture and becoming a member of the Princeton Charter Club. He excelled academically but also became attracted to the school's drama and music clubs, including the Princeton Triangle Club. Upon his graduation in 1932, he was awarded a scholarship for graduate studies in architecture for his thesis on an airport terminal design, but chose instead to join University Players, an intercollegiate summer stock company performing in West Falmouth, Massachusetts, on Cape Cod.

Career

1932–1937: Theater and early film roles

Stewart performed in bit parts in the University Players' productions in Cape Cod during the summer of 1932. The company's directors included Joshua Logan, Bretaigne Windust and Charles Leatherbee, and amongst its other actors were married couple Henry Fonda and Margaret Sullavan, who became Stewart's close friends. At the end of the season, Stewart moved to New York with his Players friends Logan, Myron McCormick, and newly single Henry Fonda. Along with McCormick, Stewart debuted on Broadway in the brief run of Carry Nation and a few weeks later – again with McCormick – appeared as a chauffeur in the comedy Goodbye Again, in which he had a walk-on line. The New Yorker commented, "Mr. James Stewart's chauffeur... comes on for three minutes and walks off to a round of spontaneous applause." Following the seven-month run of Goodbye Again, Stewart took a stage manager position in Boston, but was fired after frequently missing his cues. Returning to New York, he then landed a small part in Spring in Autumn and a role in All Good Americans, where he was required to throw a banjo out of the window. Brooks Atkinson of The New York Times wrote, "Throwing a $250 banjo out of the window at the concierge is constructive abuse and should be virtuously applauded." Both plays folded after only short runs, and Stewart began to think about going back to his studies.

Stewart was convinced to continue acting when he was cast in the lead role of Yellow Jack, playing a soldier who becomes the subject of a yellow fever experiment. It premiered at the Martin Beck Theater in March 1934. Stewart received unanimous praise from the critics, but the play proved unpopular with audiences and folded by June. During the summer, Stewart made his film debut with an unbilled appearance in the Shemp Howard comedy short Art Trouble (1934), filmed in Brooklyn, and acted in summer stock productions of We Die Exquisitely and All Paris Knows at the Red Barn Theater on Long Island. In the fall, he again received excellent reviews for his role in Divided by Three at the Ethel Barrymore Theatre, which he followed with the modestly successful Page Miss Glory and the critical failure A Journey By Night in spring 1935.

Soon after A Journey By Night ended, Stewart signed a seven-year contract with Metro-Goldwyn-Mayer (MGM), orchestrated by talent scout Bill Grady, who had been tracking Stewart's career since seeing him perform in Princeton. His first Hollywood role was a minor appearance in the Spencer Tracy vehicle The Murder Man (1935). His performance was largely ignored by critics, although the New York Herald Tribune, remembering him in Yellow Jack, called him "wasted in a bit that he handles with characteristically engaging skill." As MGM did not see leading-man material in Stewart, described by biographer Michael D. Rinella as a "lanky young bumpkin with a hesitant manner of speech" during this time, his agent Leland Hayward decided that the best path for him would be through loan-outs to other studios.

Stewart had only a small role in his second MGM film, the hit musical Rose Marie (1936), but it led to his casting in seven other films within one year, from Next Time We Love to After the Thin Man. He also received crucial help from his University Players friend Margaret Sullavan, who campaigned for him to be her leading man in the Universal romantic comedy Next Time We Love (1936), filmed right after Rose Marie. Sullavan rehearsed extensively with him, boosting his confidence and helping him incorporate his mannerisms and boyishness into his screen persona. Next Time We Love was a box-office success and received mostly positive reviews, leading Stewart to be noticed by critics and MGM executives. TIME stated that "the chief significance of [the film] in the progress of the cinema industry is likely to reside in the presence in its cast of James Stewart" and The New York Times called him "a welcome addition to the roster of Hollywood's leading men."

Stewart followed Next Time We Love with supporting roles in two commercially successful romantic comedies, Wife vs. Secretary (1936) with Clark Gable and Myrna Loy and Small Town Girl (1936). In both, he played the betrayed boyfriend of the leading lady, portrayed by Jean Harlow and Janet Gaynor, respectively. Both films garnered him some good reviews. After an appearance in the short subject Important News (1936), Stewart had his first top-billed role in the low-budget "B" movie Speed (1936), in which he played a mechanic and speed driver competing in the Indianapolis 500. The film was a critical and commercial failure, although Frank Nugent of The New York Times stated that "Mr. Stewart [and the rest of the cast] perform as pleasantly as possible."

Stewart's last three film releases of 1936 were all box-office successes. He had only a bit part in The Gorgeous Hussy, but a starring role in the musical Born to Dance with Eleanor Powell. His performance in the latter was not well-received: The New York Times stated that his "singing and dancing will (fortunately) never win him a song-and-dance-man classification," and Variety called "his singing and dancing [...] rather painful on their own," although it otherwise found Stewart aptly cast in an "assignment [that] calls for a shy youth." Stewart's last film to be released in 1936, After the Thin Man, features a shattering emotional climax rendered by Stewart. Kate Cameron of the New York Daily News wrote that he "has one grand scene in which he demonstrates most effectively that he is something more than a musical comedy juvenile."

For his next film, the romantic drama Seventh Heaven (1937), Stewart was loaned to 20th Century-Fox to play a Parisian sewer worker in a remake of Frank Borzage's silent classic released a decade earlier. He and co-star Simone Simon were miscast, and the film was a critical and commercial failure. William Boehnel of the New York World-Telegram called Stewart's performance emotionless and Eileen Creelman of The New York Sun wrote that he made little attempt to look or sound French. Stewart's next film, The Last Gangster (1937) starring Edward G. Robinson, was also a failure, but it was followed by a critically acclaimed performance in Navy Blue and Gold (1937) as a football player at the United States Naval Academy. The film was a box-office success and earned Stewart the best reviews of his career up to that point. The New York Times wrote "the ending leaves us with the conviction that James Stewart is a sincere and likable triple-threat man in the [MGM] backfield" and Variety called his performance "fine."

1938–1941: Leading man 
Despite good reviews, Stewart was still a minor star, and MGM remained hesitant to cast him in leading roles, preferring to loan him out to other studios. After a well-received supporting part in Of Human Hearts (1938), he was loaned to RKO to act opposite Ginger Rogers in the romantic comedy Vivacious Lady (1938). The production was shut down for months in 1937 as Stewart recovered from an undisclosed illness, during which he was hospitalized. RKO initially wanted to replace Stewart, but eventually the project was canceled. However, Rogers's success in a stage musical caused the film to be picked up again. Stewart was recast in Vivacious Lady at Rogers's insistence and due to his performance in Of Human Hearts. It was a critical and commercial success, and showed Stewart's talent for performing in romantic comedies; The New York Herald called him "one of the most knowing and engaging young actors appearing on the screen at present."

Stewart's third film release of 1938, the First World War drama The Shopworn Angel, saw him collaborate again with Margaret Sullavan. In his performance, Stewart drew upon his own feelings of unrequited love towards Sullavan, who was married to his agent, Leland Hayward. Although the film was otherwise well-received, critics were mixed about Stewart. Bland Johaneson of the New York Daily Mirror compared him to Stan Laurel in this melodramatic film and Variety called his performance unfocused. Irene Thier of The New York Post wrote that his role was "just another proof that this young man is one of the finest actors of the screen's young roster."

Stewart became a major star when he was loaned out to Columbia Pictures to play the lead role in Frank Capra's You Can't Take It With You (1938) opposite Jean Arthur. Stewart played the son of a banker who falls in love with a woman from a poor and eccentric family. Capra had recently completed several well-received films and was looking for a new type of leading man. He had been impressed by Stewart's role in Navy Blue and Gold (1937). According to Capra, Stewart was one of the best actors ever to hit the screen, understood character archetypes intuitively and required little directing. You Can't Take It With You became the fifth highest-grossing film of the year and won the Academy Award for Best Picture. The film was also critically successful, but while Variety wrote that the performances of Stewart and Arthur garnered "much of the laughs," most of the critical acclaim went to Lionel Barrymore and Edward Arnold.

In contrast to the success of You Can't Take It With You, Stewart's first three film releases of 1939 were all commercial disappointments. In the melodrama Made for Each Other (1939), he shared the screen with Carole Lombard. Stewart blamed its directing and screenwriting for its poor box-office performance. Regardless, the film received favorable reviews, with Newsweek writing that Stewart and Lombard were "perfectly cast in the leading roles." The other two films, The Ice Follies of 1939 and It's a Wonderful World, were critical failures.

In Stewart's fourth 1939 film, he worked with Capra and Arthur again in the political comedy-drama Mr. Smith Goes to Washington. Stewart played an idealist thrown into the political arena. It garnered critical praise and became the third-highest-grossing film of the year. The Nation stated "[Stewart] takes first place among Hollywood actors...Now he is mature and gives a difficult part, with many nuances, moments of tragic-comic impact." Later, critic Andrew Sarris qualified Stewart's performance as "lean, gangling, idealistic to the point of being neurotic, thoughtful to the point of being tongue-tied," describing him as "particularly gifted in expressing the emotional ambivalence of the action hero." Stewart won the New York Film Critics Circle award and received his first nomination for the Academy Award for Best Actor.

Stewart's last screen appearance of 1939 came in the Western Destry Rides Again, in which he portrayed a pacifist lawman and Marlene Dietrich a saloon girl who falls in love with him. It was critically and commercially successful. TIME magazine wrote, "James Stewart, who had just turned in the top performance of his cinematurity as Jefferson Smith in Mr. Smith Goes to Washington, turns in as good a performance or better as Thomas Jefferson Destry." Between films, Stewart had begun a radio career, and had become a distinctive voice on the Lux Radio Theater, The Screen Guild Theater and other shows. So well-known had his slow drawl become that comedians began impersonating him.

Stewart and Sullavan reunited for two films in 1940. The Ernst Lubitsch romantic comedy The Shop Around the Corner starred them as co-workers who cannot stand each other but unknowingly become romantic pen-pals. It received good reviews and was a box-office success in Europe, but failed to find an audience in the US, where less-gentle screwball comedies were more popular. Director Lubitsch assessed it to be the best film of his career, and it has been regarded highly by later critics, such as Pauline Kael and Richard Schickel.

The drama The Mortal Storm, directed by Frank Borzage, featured Sullavan and Stewart as lovers caught in turmoil upon Hitler's rise to power. It was one of the first blatantly anti-Nazi films to be produced in Hollywood, but according to film scholar Ben Urwand, "ultimately made very little impact" as it did not show the persecution experienced by Jews or name that ethnic group. Despite being well received by critics, it failed at the box office. Ten days after filming The Mortal Storm, Stewart began filming No Time for Comedy (1940) with Rosalind Russell. Critics complimented Stewart's performance; Bosley Crowther of The New York Times called Stewart "the best thing in the show," yet the film was again not a box-office success.

Stewart's final film to be released in 1940 was George Cukor's romantic comedy The Philadelphia Story, in which he played an intrusive, fast-talking reporter sent to cover the wedding of a socialite (Katharine Hepburn) with the help of her ex-husband (Cary Grant). The film became one of the largest box-office successes of the year, and received widespread critical acclaim. The New York Herald Tribune stated that "Stewart...contributes most of the comedy to the show...In addition, he contributes some of the most irresistible romantic moments." His performance earned him his only Academy Award in a competitive category for Best Actor, beating out Henry Fonda, for whom he had voted and with whom he had once roomed, both almost broke, in the early 1930s in New York.  Stewart himself assessed his performance in Mr. Smith to be superior, and believed the Academy was recompensing for not giving him the award the year prior. Moreover, Stewart's character was a supporting role, not the male lead. He gave the Oscar to his father, who displayed it at his hardware store alongside other family awards and military medals.

Stewart next appeared in two comedies—Come Live with Me (1941), which paired him with Hedy Lamarr, and Pot o' Gold (1941), featuring Paulette Goddard—that were both box-office failures. Stewart considered the latter to be the worst film of his career. His last film before military service was the musical Ziegfeld Girl (1941), which co-starred Judy Garland, Hedy Lamarr and Lana Turner. It was a critical failure but also one of the best box-office performers of the year.

1941–1947: Military service
Stewart became the first major American movie star to enlist in the United States Army to fight in World War II. His family had deep military roots: both of his grandfathers had fought in the Civil War, and his father had served during both the Spanish–American War and World War I. After first being rejected for low weight in November, 1940, he enlisted in February, 1941. As an experienced pilot, he reported for induction as a private in the Air Corps on March 22, 1941. Soon to be 33 years old, he was over the age limit for Aviation Cadet training—the normal path of commissioning for pilots, navigators and bombardiers—and therefore applied for an Air Corps commission as both a college graduate and a licensed commercial pilot. Stewart received his commission as a second lieutenant on January 1, 1942.

After enlisting, Stewart made no new commercial films, although he remained under contract to MGM. His public appearances were limited to engagements for the Army Air Forces. The Air Corps scheduled him on network radio with Edgar Bergen and Charlie McCarthy, and on the radio program We Hold These Truths, a celebration of the United States Bill of Rights, which was broadcast a week after the attack on Pearl Harbor. Stewart also appeared in a First Motion Picture Unit short film, Winning Your Wings, to help recruit airmen. Nominated for an Academy Award for Best Documentary in 1942, it appeared in movie theaters nationwide beginning in late May, 1942 and resulted in 150,000 new recruits.

Stewart was concerned that his celebrity status would relegate him to duties behind the lines. After spending over a year training pilots at Kirtland Army Airfield in Albuquerque, New Mexico, he appealed to his commander and in November 1943 was sent to England as part of the 445th Bombardment Group to fly B-24 Liberators. He was based initially at RAF Tibenham, before moving to RAF Old Buckenham.

Stewart was promoted to major following a mission to Ludwigshafen, Germany, on January 7, 1944. He was awarded the Distinguished Flying Cross for actions as deputy commander of the 2nd Bombardment Wing, and the French Croix de Guerre with palm and the Air Medal with three oak leaf clusters. Stewart was promoted to full colonel on March 29, 1945, becoming one of the few Americans to ever rise from private to colonel in only four years. At the beginning of June 1945, Stewart was the presiding officer of the court martial of a pilot and navigator who accidentally bombed Zürich, Switzerland.

Stewart returned to the United States in early fall 1945. He continued to play a role in reserve of the Army Air Forces after the war and was also one of the 12 founders of the Air Force Association in October, 1945. Stewart would eventually transfer to the reserves of the United States Air Force after the Army Air Forces split from the Army in 1947. During active-duty periods he served with the Strategic Air Command and completed transition training as a pilot on the B-47 and B-52.

Stewart was first nominated for promotion to brigadier general in February, 1957; however, his promotion was initially opposed by Senator Margaret Chase Smith. At the time of the nomination, the Washington Daily News noted: "He trains actively with the Reserve every year. He's had 18 hours as first pilot of a B-52." On July 23, 1959, Stewart was promoted to brigadier general, becoming the highest-ranking actor in American military history. During the Vietnam War, he flew as a non-duty observer in a B-52 on an Arc Light bombing mission in February, 1966. He served for 27 years, officially retiring from the Air Force on May 31, 1968, when he reached the mandatory retirement age of 60. Upon his retirement, he was awarded the United States Air Force Distinguished Service Medal. Stewart rarely spoke about his wartime service but did appear in an episode of the British television documentary series The World at War (1974), commenting on the disastrous 1943 mission against Schweinfurt, Germany.

1946–1949: Postwar films 
After his experiences in the war, Stewart considered returning to Pennsylvania to run the family store. His former agent, Leland Hayward, had also left the talent business in 1944 after selling his roster of stars, including Stewart, to Music Corporation of America (MCA). Stewart decided to not renew his MGM contract and instead signed a deal with MCA. He later stated that he was given a new beginning by Frank Capra, who asked him to star in It's a Wonderful Life (1946), the first postwar film for both of them. Stewart played George Bailey, an upstanding small-town man who becomes increasingly frustrated by his ordinary existence and financial troubles. Driven to suicide on Christmas Eve, he is led to reassess his life by Clarence Odbody, an "angel, second class" played by Henry Travers. During filming, Stewart experienced doubts about his abilities and continued to consider retiring from acting.

Although It's a Wonderful Life was nominated for five Academy Awards, including Stewart's third Best Actor nomination, it received mixed reviews and was only a moderate success at the box office, failing to cover its production costs. Several critics found the movie too sentimental, although Bosley Crowther wrote that Stewart did a "warmly appealing job, indicating that he has grown in spiritual stature as well as in talent during the years he was in the war," and President Harry S. Truman concluded that "If [my wife] and I had a son we'd want him to be just like Jimmy Stewart [in this film]." In the decades since its release, It's a Wonderful Life has grown to define Stewart's film persona and is widely considered a Christmas classic, and according to the American Film Institute is one of the 100 best American movies ever made. Andrew Sarris stated that Stewart's performance was underappreciated by critics of the time who could not see "the force and fury" of it, and considered his proposal scene with Donna Reed, "one of the most sublimely histrionic expressions of passion." Stewart later named the film his personal favorite out of his filmography.

In the aftermath of It's A Wonderful Life, Capra's production company went into bankruptcy, while Stewart continued to have doubts about his acting abilities. His generation of actors was fading and a new wave of actors, including Marlon Brando, Montgomery Clift and James Dean, would soon remake Hollywood. Stewart returned to making radio dramas in 1946; he continued this work between films until the mid-1950s. He also made a comeback on Broadway to star in Mary Coyle Chase's Harvey in July, 1947, replacing the original star Frank Fay for the duration of his vacation. The play had opened to nearly universal praise in 1944, and told the story of Elwood P. Dowd, a wealthy eccentric, whose best friend is an invisible man-sized rabbit, and whose relatives are trying to get him committed to a mental asylum. Stewart gained a following in the unconventional play, and although Fay returned to the role in August, they decided that Stewart would take his place again the next summer. Stewart's only film to be released in 1947 was the William A. Wellman comedy Magic Town, one of the first films about the new science of public opinion polling. It was poorly received both commercially and critically. 

Stewart appeared in four new film releases in 1948. Call Northside 777 was a critically acclaimed film noir, while the musical comedy On Our Merry Way, in which Stewart and Henry Fonda played jazz musicians in an ensemble cast, was a critical and commercial failure. The comedy You Gotta Stay Happy, which paired Stewart with Joan Fontaine, was the most successful of his post-war films up to that point. Rope, in which Stewart played the idolized teacher of two young men who commit murder to show their supposed superiority, began his collaboration with Alfred Hitchcock. Shot in long "real-time" takes, Stewart felt pressure to be flawless in his performance; the added stress led to him sleeping very little and drinking more heavily. Rope received mixed reviews, and Andrew Sarris and Scott Eyman have later called him miscast in the role of a Nietzsche-loving philosophy professor. The film's screenwriter Arthur Laurents also stated that "the casting of [Stewart] was absolutely destructive. He's not sexual as an actor."

Stewart found success again with The Stratton Story (1949), playing baseball champion Monty Stratton opposite June Allyson. It became the sixth-highest-grossing film of 1949 and was well received by the critics. The New York Times noted, "The Stratton Story was the best thing that has yet happened to Mr. Stewart in his post-war film career...he gives such a winning performance that it is almost impossible to imagine any one else playing the role." Stewart's other 1949 release saw him reunited with Spencer Tracy in the World War II film Malaya (1949). It was a commercial failure and received mixed reviews.

1950–1959: Collaborations with Alfred Hitchcock and Anthony Mann 

In the 1950s, Stewart experienced a career renewal as the star of Westerns and collaborated on several films with director Anthony Mann. The first of these was the Universal production Winchester '73 (1950), which Stewart agreed to do in exchange for being cast in a screen adaptation of Harvey. It also marked a turning point in Hollywood, as Stewart's agent, Lew Wasserman, brokered an innovative deal with Universal, in which Stewart would receive no fee in exchange for a percentage of the profits. Stewart was also granted authority to collaborate with the studio on casting and hiring decisions. Stewart ended up earning about $600,000 for Winchester '73, significantly more than his usual fee, and other stars quickly capitalized on this new way of doing business, which further undermined the decaying studio system.

Stewart chose Mann to direct, and the film gave him the idea of redefining his screen persona through the Western genre. In the film, Stewart is a tough, vengeful sharpshooter, the winner of a prized rifle which is stolen and passes through many hands, until the showdown between him and his brother. Winchester '73 became a box-office success upon its summer release and earned Stewart rave reviews. He also starred in another successful Western that summer, Broken Arrow (1950), which featured him as an ex-soldier and Native American agent making peace with the Apache.

Stewart's third film release of 1950 was the comedy The Jackpot; it received critical acclaim and was commercially successful, but was a minor film in his repertoire and has largely been forgotten by contemporary critics and fans. In December, 1950, the screen adaptation of Harvey was released, directed by Henry Koster and with Stewart reprising his stage role. With critics again comparing his performance with Fay's, Stewart's performance as well as the film itself received mixed reviews. Bosley Crowther of The New York Times wrote that "so darling is the acting of James Stewart [...] and all the rest that a virtually brand-new experience is still in store for even those who saw the play," while Variety called him "perfect" in the role. John McCarten of the New Yorker stated that although he "doesn't bring his part to the battered authority of Frank Fay...he nevertheless succeeds in making plausible the notion that Harvey, the rabbit, would accept him as a pal." Stewart later stated that he was dissatisfied with his performance, stating, "I played him a little too dreamily, a little too cute-cute." Despite its poor box office, Stewart received his fourth Academy Award nomination as well as his first Golden Globe nomination. Similar to It's a Wonderful Life, Harvey achieved popularity later, after frequent television showings.

Stewart appeared in only one film released in 1951, playing a scientist in Koster's British production No Highway in the Sky, which was one of the first airplane disaster films ever made. Filmed in England, it became a box office success in the United Kingdom, but failed to attract audiences in the United States. Stewart took a small supporting role as a troubled clown in Cecil B. DeMille's The Greatest Show on Earth (1952), which went on to win the Academy Award for Best Picture. Critics were curious why Stewart had taken such a small, out-of-character role; he responded that he was inspired by Lon Chaney's ability to disguise himself while letting his character emerge. In the same year, Stewart starred in a critically and commercially failed biopic Carbine Williams (1952), and continued his collaboration with Mann in Bend of the River (1952), which was again a commercial and critical success.Stewart followed Bend of the River with four more collaborations with Mann in the next two years. The Naked Spur (1953) and The Far Country (1954) were successful with audiences and developed Stewart's screen persona into a more mature, ambiguous, and edgier presence. The films featured him as troubled cowboys seeking redemption while facing corrupt cattlemen, ranchers and outlaws; a man who knows violence first-hand and struggles to control it. The Stewart–Mann collaborations laid the foundation for many of the Westerns of the 1950s and remain popular today for their grittier, more realistic depiction of the classic movie genre. In addition, Stewart starred in the Western radio show The Six Shooter for its one-season run from 1953 to 1954. He and Mann also collaborated on films outside the Western genre on Thunder Bay (1953) and The Glenn Miller Story (1954), the latter a critically acclaimed biopic in which he starred opposite June Allyson. It garnered Stewart a BAFTA nomination, and continued his portrayals of 'American heroes'.

Stewart's second collaboration with Hitchcock, the thriller Rear Window, became the eighth highest-grossing film of 1954. Hitchcock and Stewart had also formed a corporation, Patron Inc., to produce the film. Stewart portrayed a photographer, loosely based on Robert Capa, who projects his fantasies and fears onto the people he observes out his apartment window while on hiatus due to a broken leg, and comes to believe that he has witnessed a murder. Limited by his wheelchair, Stewart had to react to what his character sees with mostly facial responses. Like Mann, Hitchcock uncovered new depths to Stewart's acting, showing a protagonist confronting his fears and his repressed desires. Although most of the initial acclaim for Rear Window was directed towards Hitchcock, critic Vincent Canby later described Stewart's performance in it as "grand" and stated that "[his] longtime star status in Hollywood has always obscured recognition of his talent." 1954 was a landmark year in Stewart's career in terms of audience success, and he topped Look magazine's list of the most-popular movie stars, displacing rival Western star John Wayne.

Stewart continued his successful box-office run with two collaborations with Mann in 1955. Strategic Air Command paired him again with June Allyson in a Cold War propaganda film geared to show audiences that extensive military spending was necessary. Stewart took a central role in its development, using his experiences from the air force. Despite criticism for the dry, mechanistic storyline, it became the sixth highest-grossing film of 1955. Stewart's final collaboration with Mann in the Western genre, The Man from Laramie, one of the first Westerns to be shot in CinemaScope, was well received by the critics and audiences alike. Following his work with Mann, Stewart starred opposite Doris Day in Hitchcock's remake of his earlier film The Man Who Knew Too Much (1956). The film was yet another success. Even though critics preferred the first version, Hitchcock himself considered his remake superior.

Stewart's next film, Billy Wilder's The Spirit of St. Louis (1957), saw him star as his childhood hero, Charles Lindbergh. It was a big-budget production with elaborate special effects for the flying sequences, but received only mixed reviews and did not earn back its production costs. Stewart ended the year with a starring role in the Western Night Passage (1957), which had originally been slated as his ninth collaboration with Mann. During the pre-production, a rift developed between Mann and writer Borden Chase over the script, which Mann considered weak. Mann decided to leave the film, and never collaborated with Stewart again. James Neilson replaced Mann, and the film opened in 1957 to become a box-office flop. Soured by this failure, Stewart avoided the genre and would not make another Western for four years.

Stewart's collaboration with Hitchcock ended the following year with Vertigo (1958), in which he starred as an acrophobic former policeman who becomes obsessed with a woman (Kim Novak) he is shadowing. Although Vertigo has later become considered one of Hitchcock's key works and was ranked the greatest film ever made by the Sight & Sound critics' poll in 2012, it met with unenthusiastic reviews and poor box-office receipts upon its release. Regardless, several critics complimented Stewart for his performance, with Bosley Crowther noting, "Mr. Stewart, as usual, manages to act awfully tense in a casual way."

Hitchcock blamed the film's failure on Stewart being too old to convincingly be Novak's love interest: he was fifty years old at the time and had begun wearing a silver hairpiece in his movies. Consequently, Hitchcock cast Cary Grant in his next film, North by Northwest (1959), a role Stewart wanted; Grant was four years older than Stewart but photographed much younger. Stewart's second 1958 film release, the romantic comedy Bell, Book and Candle (1958), also paired him with Kim Novak, with Stewart later echoing Hitchcock in saying that he was miscast as 25-year-old Novak's romantic partner. The film and Stewart's performance received poor reviews and resulted in a box office failure. However, according to film scholar David Bingham, by the early 1950s, "Stewart's personality was so credible and well-established," that his choice of role no longer affected his popularity.

Stewart ended the decade with Otto Preminger's realistic courtroom drama Anatomy of a Murder (1959) and the crime film The FBI Story (1959). The former was a box office success despite its explicit dealing with subjects such as rape, and garnered good reviews. Stewart received critical acclaim for his role as a small-town lawyer involved in a difficult murder case; Bosley Crowther called it "one of the finest performances of his career." Stewart won his first BAFTA, a Volpi Cup, a New York Film Critics Circle Award and a Producers Guild of America Award, as well as gained his fifth and final Academy Award nomination for his performance. The latter film, in which Stewart portrayed a Depression-era FBI agent, was less well received by critics and was commercially unsuccessful. Despite the commercial failure of The FBI Story, the film marked the close of the most commercially successful decade of Stewart's career. According to Quigley's annual poll, Stewart was one of the top money-making stars for ten years, appearing in the top ten in 1950, 1952–1959, and 1965. He topped the list in 1955.

1960–1970: Westerns and later career 

Stewart opened the new decade by starring in the war film The Mountain Road (1960). To his surprise, it was a box office failure, despite his claims that it was one of the best scripts he'd ever read. He began a new director-collaboration with John Ford, making his debut in his films in the Western Two Rode Together (1961), which had thematic echoes of Ford's The Searchers. The same year, he also narrated the film X-15 for the USAF. Stewart was considered for the role of Atticus Finch in the 1962 film adaptation of Harper Lee's novel To Kill a Mockingbird, but he turned it down, concerned that the story was too controversial.

Stewart and Ford's next collaboration was The Man Who Shot Liberty Valance (1962). A classic psychological Western, the picture was shot in black-and-white film noir style at Ford's insistence, with Stewart as an East Coast attorney who goes against his non-violent principles when he is forced to confront a psychopathic outlaw (Lee Marvin) in a small frontier town. The complex film initially garnered mixed reviews, but became a critical favorite over the ensuing decades. Stewart was billed above John Wayne in posters and the trailers, but Wayne received top billing in the film itself. Stewart, Wayne and Ford also collaborated for a television play that same year, Flashing Spikes (1962), for ABC's anthology series Alcoa Premiere, albeit featuring Wayne billed with a television pseudonym ("Michael Morris", also used for Wayne's brief appearance in the John Ford-directed episode of the television series Wagon Train titled "The Colter Craven Story") for his lengthy cameo. Next, Stewart appeared as part of an all-star cast—including Henry Fonda and John Wayne—in How the West Was Won, a Western epic released in the United States in early 1963. The film went on to win three Academy Awards and reap massive box-office figures.

In 1962, Stewart signed a multi-movie deal with 20th Century Fox. The first two of these films reunited him with director Henry Koster in the family-friendly comedies Mr. Hobbs Takes a Vacation (1962) with Maureen O'Hara and Take Her, She's Mine (1963), which were both box-office successes. The former received moderately positive reviews and won Stewart the Silver Bear for Best Actor at the Berlin International Film Festival; the latter was panned by the critics. Stewart then appeared in John Ford's final Western, Cheyenne Autumn (1964), playing a white-suited Wyatt Earp in a long semi-comedic sequence in the middle of the movie. The film failed domestically and was quickly forgotten.

In 1965, Stewart was given his first honorary award for his career, the Cecil B. DeMille Award. He appeared in three films that year. The Fox family-comedy Dear Brigitte (1965), which featured French actress Brigitte Bardot as the object of Stewart's son's infatuation, was a box-office failure. The Civil War film Shenandoah (1965) was a commercial success with strong anti-war and humanitarian themes. The Flight of the Phoenix (1965) continued Stewart's series of aviation-themed films; it was well-received critically, but a box-office failure.

For the next few years, Stewart acted in a series of Westerns: The Rare Breed (1966) with Maureen O'Hara, Firecreek (1968) with Henry Fonda, Bandolero! (1968) with Dean Martin, and The Cheyenne Social Club (1970) with Henry Fonda again. In 1968, he received the Screen Actors Guild Life Achievement Award. Stewart returned on Broadway to reprise his role as Elwood P. Dowd in Harvey at the ANTA Theatre in February 1970; the revival ran until May. He won the Drama Desk Award for Outstanding Performance for it.

1971–1997: Television and semi-retirement 
In 1971, Stewart starred in the NBC sitcom The Jimmy Stewart Show. He played a small-town college professor whose adult son moves back home with his family. Stewart disliked the amount of work needed to film the show each week and was relieved when it was canceled after only one season due to bad reviews and lack of audiences. His only film release for 1971, the comedy-drama Fools' Parade, was more-positively received. Robert Greenspun of The New York Times stated that "the movie belongs to Stewart, who has never been more wonderful." For his contributions to Western films, Stewart was inducted into the Hall of Great Western Performers at the National Cowboy & Western Heritage Museum in Oklahoma City in 1972.

Stewart returned to television in Harvey for NBC's Hallmark Hall of Fame series in 1972, and then starred in the CBS mystery series Hawkins in 1973. Playing a small-town lawyer investigating mysterious cases – similar to his character in Anatomy of a Murder – Stewart won a Golden Globe for his performance. Nevertheless, Hawkins failed to gain a wide audience, possibly because it rotated with Shaft, which had a starkly conflicting demographic, and was canceled after one season. Stewart also periodically appeared on Johnny Carson's The Tonight Show, sharing poems he had written at different times in his life. His poems were later compiled into a short collection, Jimmy Stewart and His Poems (1989).

After performing again in Harvey at the Prince of Wales Theatre in London in 1975, Stewart returned to films with a major supporting role in John Wayne's final film, The Shootist (1976), playing a doctor giving Wayne's gunfighter a terminal cancer diagnosis. By this time, Stewart had a hearing impairment, which affected his ability to hear his cues and led to him repeatedly flubbing his lines; his vanity would not allow him to admit this or to wear a hearing aid. Stewart was offered the role of Howard Beale in Network (1976), but refused it due to its explicit language. Instead, he appeared in supporting roles in the disaster film Airport '77 (1977) with Jack Lemmon, the remake of The Big Sleep (1978) with Robert Mitchum as Philip Marlowe, and the family film The Magic of Lassie (1978). Despite mixed reviews, Airport '77 was a box-office success, but the two other films were commercial and critical failures. Harry Haun of New York Daily News wrote in his review of The Big Sleep that it was "really sad to see James Stewart struggle so earnestly with material that just isn't there." Stewart made a memorable cameo appearance on the final episode of The Carol Burnett Show in March 1978, surprising Burnett, a lifelong Stewart fan. 

Stewart's final live-action feature film was the critically panned Japanese film The Green Horizon (1980), directed by Susumu Hani. Stewart took the role because the film promoted wildlife conservation and allowed his family to travel with him to Kenya. In the 1980s, Stewart semi-retired from acting. He was offered the role of Norman Thayer in On Golden Pond (1981), but turned it down because he disliked the film's father-daughter relationship; the role went instead to his friend, Henry Fonda. Stewart filmed two television movies in the 1980s: Mr. Krueger's Christmas (1980), produced by the Church of Jesus Christ of Latter-day Saints, which allowed him to fulfill a lifelong dream to conduct the Mormon Tabernacle Choir, and Right of Way (1983), an HBO drama that co-starred Bette Davis. He also made an appearance in the historical miniseries North and South in 1986, and did voiceover work for commercials for Campbell's Soups in the 1980s and 1990s. Stewart's last film performance was voicing the character of Sheriff Wylie Burp in the animated movie An American Tail: Fievel Goes West (1991).

Stewart remained in the public eye due to his frequent visits to the White House during the Reagan administration. The re-release of Hitchcock films gained him renewed recognition, with Rear Window and Vertigo in particular praised by film critics. Stewart also received several honorary film industry awards at the end of his career: an American Film Institute Award in 1980, a Silver Bear in 1982, Kennedy Center Honors in 1983, an Academy Honorary Award in 1985, and National Board of Review and Film Society of Lincoln Center's Chaplin Award in 1990. The honorary Oscar was presented by former co-star Cary Grant "for his 50 years of memorable performances, for his high ideals both on and off the screen, with respect and affection of his colleagues." In addition, Stewart received the highest civilian award in the US, the Presidential Medal of Freedom, "for his contributions in the fields of the arts, entertainment and public service," in 1985.

Personal life

Romantic relationships
As a friend, mentor, and focus of his early romantic feelings, Margaret Sullavan had a unique influence on Stewart's life. They had met while they were both performing for the University Players; he was smitten with her and invited her on a date. She regarded him as just a close friend and co-worker, and they never began a romantic relationship, but Stewart regardless felt unrequited romantic love toward her for many years. Though Sullavan was always aware of his feelings, he never directly revealed them to her. Sullavan loved Stewart but was never interested in him romantically; rather, she felt protective and maternal. However, the director of The Shopworn Angel, H.C. Potter suggested they might have married had Stewart been more forthcoming with his feelings. She became his acting mentor in Hollywood and according to director Edward H. Griffith, "made [him] a star"; they went on to co-star in four films: Next Time You Love (1936), The Shopworn Angel (1938), The Shop Around the Corner (1940) and The Mortal Storm (1940).

Stewart did not marry until his forties, which attracted a significant amount of contemporary media attention; gossip columnist Hedda Hopper called him the "Great American Bachelor". Regardless, he had several romantic relationships prior to marriage. After being introduced by Henry Fonda, Stewart and Ginger Rogers had a relationship in 1935 (Fonda was dating Rogers' good friend Lucille Ball).
 During production of The Shopworn Angel (1938), Stewart dated actress Norma Shearer for six weeks. Afterward, he dated Loretta Young; she wanted to settle down but Stewart did not. While filming Destry Rides Again (1939), Stewart had an affair with his co-star Marlene Dietrich, who was married at the time. Dietrich allegedly became pregnant, but it was quickly terminated. Stewart ended their relationship after the filming was completed. Hurt by Stewart's rejection, she barely mentioned him in her memoir and waved him off as a one-time affair.

He dated Olivia de Havilland in the late 1930s and early 1940s and even proposed marriage to her, but she rejected the proposal, as she believed he was not ready to settle down. She ended the relationship shortly before he began his military service, as she had fallen in love with director John Huston.

War career as pilot (1941–1946)
A licensed civilian pilot, Stewart enlisted in the Army Air Forces early in 1941. After seeing action in Europe during WWII, he attained the rank of colonel and received several awards for his service. He was made brigadier general in the Air Force Reserve in 1959.  He retired from the service in 1968, at which time he was awarded the Air Force Distinguished Service Medal. President Reagan recounted at a White House briefing that he was corrected by Stewart himself after Reagan incorrectly announced he was a major general at a campaign event.

Marriage and family
In 1942, while serving in the military, Stewart met singer Dinah Shore at the Hollywood Canteen, a club mainly for servicemen. They began a romantic relationship and were nearly married in Las Vegas in 1943, but Stewart called off the marriage before they arrived, citing cold feet. After the war, Stewart began a relationship with Myrna Dell while he was filming The Stratton Story (1949). Although gossip columnists made claims that they were planning to marry, Dell said this was not true.

Stewart's first interaction with his future wife, Gloria Hatrick McLean, was at Keenan Wynn's Christmas party in 1947. He had crashed the party and became inebriated, leaving a poor impression of himself with Hatrick. A year later, Gary Cooper and his wife Veronica invited Hatrick and Stewart to a dinner party, and the two began dating. A former model, Hatrick was divorced with two children. Stewart and Hatrick were married at Brentwood Presbyterian Church on August 9, 1949, and remained married until her death from lung cancer in 1994.

The couple purchased a home in Beverly Hills in 1951, where they resided for the rest of their lives. They also owned the Winecup Gamble Ranch in Nevada from 1953 to 1957. Stewart adopted Gloria's two sons, Ronald (1944–1969) and Michael (born 1946), and with Gloria he had twin daughters, Judy and Kelly, on May 7, 1951. Ronald was killed in action in Vietnam on June 8, 1969, at the age of 24, while serving as a lieutenant in the Marine Corps.

Friendships, interests, and character

Stewart was guarded about his personal life and, according to biographer Scott Eyman, tended in interviews to avoid the emotional connection he was known for in his films, preferring to keep his thoughts and feelings to himself. He was known as a loner who did not have intimate relationships with many people. Director John Ford said of Stewart, "You don't get to know Jimmy Stewart; Jimmy Stewart gets to know you."

Stewart's 50-year friendship with Henry Fonda began in Manhattan when Fonda invited Stewart to be his third roommate (in addition to Joshua Logan and Myron McCormick) in order to make the rent. When Stewart moved to Hollywood in 1935, he again shared an apartment with Fonda, and the two gained reputations as playboys. Over their careers, they starred in four films together: On Our Merry Way (1948), How the West Was Won (1962), Firecreek (1968), and The Cheyenne Social Club (1970). Both Stewart's and Fonda's children later noted that their favorite activity when not working seemed to be quietly sharing time together while building and painting model airplanes, a hobby they had taken up in New York years earlier. Besides building model airplanes, Stewart and Fonda liked to build and fly kites, play golf and reminisce about the "old days". After Fonda's death in 1982, Stewart's only public comment was "I've just lost my best friend." Their friendship was chronicled in Scott Eyman's biography, Hank and Jim (2017).

Aside from Fonda, Stewart's close friends included his former agent, Leland Hayward; director John Ford; photographer John Swope, Stewart's former roommate; and Billy Grady, the talent scout who discovered Stewart and also served as the best man at his wedding. Gary Cooper was another close friend of Stewart's. On April 17, 1961, Cooper was too ill (with cancer) to attend the 33rd Academy Awards ceremony, so Stewart accepted the honorary Oscar on his behalf.

In addition to his film career, Stewart had diversified investments including real estate, oil wells, the charter-plane company Southwest Airways and membership on major corporate boards, and he became a multimillionaire. Already prior to his enlistment in the Air Corps, he had been an avid pilot, with a private pilot certificate and a commercial pilot license as well as over 400 hours of flying time. A highly-proficient pilot, he entered a cross-country race with Leland Hayward in 1937, and was one of the early investors in Thunderbird Field, a pilot-training school built and operated by Southwest Airways in Glendale, Arizona.

Stewart was also active in philanthropy over the years. He served as the national vice-chairman of entertainment for the American Red Cross's fund-raising campaign for wounded soldiers in Vietnam, as well as contributed donations for improvements and restorations to Indiana, his hometown in Pennsylvania. His signature charity event, "The Jimmy Stewart Relay Marathon Race", held annually since 1982, has raised millions of dollars for the Child and Family Development Center at St. John's Health Center in Santa Monica, California.

Stewart was a lifelong supporter of scouting, having been a Second Class Scout and earning the Silver Buffalo Award when he was a youth. He was also an adult Scout leader and in the 1970s and 1980s he made advertisements for the Boy Scouts of America, which led to his being sometimes incorrectly identified as an Eagle Scout. An award for Boy Scouts, "The James M. Stewart Good Citizenship Award" has been presented since 2003. Stewart was also a Life Member of the Sons of the Revolution in California.

Political views

Stewart was a staunch conservative Republican throughout his life. A political argument in 1947 reportedly led to a fistfight with friend Henry Fonda (a liberal Democrat), according to some accounts, but the two maintained their friendship by never discussing politics again. The fistfight may be apocryphal, as Jhan Robbins quotes Stewart as saying, "Our views never interfered with our feelings for each other. We just didn't talk about certain things. I can't remember ever having an argument with him⁠—ever!"

In 1964, Stewart campaigned for the conservative presidential candidate Barry Goldwater and, according to biographer Marc Eliot, erred on the obsessive prior to the election. Stewart was a hawk on the Vietnam War, and maintained that his son, Ronald, did not die in vain. Following the assassination of Senator Robert F. Kennedy in 1968, Stewart, Charlton Heston, Kirk Douglas and Gregory Peck issued a statement calling for support of President Lyndon B. Johnson's Gun Control Act of 1968.

Stewart actively supported Ronald Reagan's bid for the Republican presidential nomination in 1976. He attended Reagan's campaign rallies, in one speech assuring that he was more conservative than ever, regardless of the death of his son in the Vietnam War. In 1988, Stewart made a plea in Congressional hearings, along with Burt Lancaster, Katharine Hepburn, Ginger Rogers, film director Martin Scorsese and many others, against Ted Turner's decision to 'colorize' classic black and white films, including It's a Wonderful Life. Stewart stated, "the coloring of black-and-white films is wrong. It's morally and artistically wrong and these profiteers should leave our film industry alone." In 1989, Stewart founded the American Spirit Foundation to apply entertainment-industry resources to developing innovative approaches to public education and to assist the emerging democracy movements in the former Iron Curtain countries. In the last years of his life, he supported the re-election of Jesse Helms to the Senate in 1990, and also donated to the campaign of Bob Dole for the 1996 presidential election.

Final years and death

Stewart's wife Gloria died of lung cancer on February 16, 1994, aged 75. According to biographer Donald Dewey, her death left Stewart depressed and "lost at sea". Stewart became even more reclusive, spending most of his time in his bedroom, exiting only to eat and visit with his children. He shut out most people from his life, not only media and fans but also his co-stars and friends. His friends Leonard Gershe and Gregory Peck said Stewart was not depressed or unhappy, but finally allowed to rest and be alone.

Stewart was hospitalized after falling in December 1995. In December 1996, he was due to have the battery in his pacemaker changed but opted not to have that done. In February 1997, he was hospitalized for an irregular heartbeat. On June 25, a thrombosis formed in his right leg, leading to a pulmonary embolism one week later. Stewart died of a heart attack caused by the embolism at the age of 89, surrounded by his children at his home in Beverly Hills, on July 2, 1997. President Bill Clinton commented that America had lost a "national treasure ... a great actor, a gentleman and a patriot." He was buried at Forest Lawn Memorial Park in Glendale, California. More than 3,000 mourners attended his memorial service, including June Allyson, Carol Burnett, Bob Hope, Lew Wasserman, Nancy Reagan, Esther Williams, and Robert Stack. The service included full military honors and three volleys of musketry.

Acting style and screen persona

According to biographer Scott Eyman, Stewart was an instinctive actor. He was natural and at ease in front of the camera, despite his shy off-screen personality. In line with his natural and conversational acting style, Stewart's co-stars found him easy to work with, as he was willing to improvise around any situation that arose while filming. Later in his career, Stewart began to resent his reputation of having a "natural" acting technique. He asserted that there wasn't anything natural about standing on a sound stage in front of lights and cameras while acting out a scene.

Stewart had established early in his career that he was proficient at communicating personality and character nuances through his performances alone. He used an "inside-out" acting technique, preferring to represent the character without accents, makeup, and props. Additionally, he tended to act with his body, not only with his voice and face; for example, in Harvey, Stewart portrays the main character's age and loneliness by slightly hunching down. He was also known for his pauses that had the ability to hold the audience's attention. Film critic Geoffrey O'Brien related that Stewart's "stammering pauses" created anxious space for the audience, leaving them in anticipation for the scene which Stewart took his time leading up to.

Stewart himself claimed to dislike his earlier film performances, saying he was "all hands and feet", adding that he "didn't seem to know what to do with either". He mentioned that even though he did not always like his performances, he would not get discouraged. He said, "But I always tried, and if the script wasn't too good, well, then, I just tried a little bit harder. I hope, though, not so hard that it shows." Former co-star Kim Novak stated of his acting style that for emotional scenes, he would access emotions deep inside of him and would take time to wind down after the scene ended. He could not turn it off immediately after the director yelled cut.

Stewart was particularly adept at performing vulnerable scenes with women. Jack Lemmon suggested that Stewart's talent for performing with women was that he was able to allow the audience to see the respect and gentility he felt toward the women through his eyes. He showed that his characters needed them as much as their characters needed him. In connection to Stewart's screen persona with women, Peter Bradshaw said The Philadelphia Story is "a film every school pupil should see" due to Stewart's character's clear explanation of sexual consent after being accused of taking advantage of the main female character.

Stewart's screen persona was that of an "everyman", an ordinary man placed in extraordinary circumstances. Audiences could identify with him, in contrast to other Hollywood leading men of the time, such as Cary Grant, who represented what the audience wanted to become. Stewart's screen persona has been compared to those of Gary Cooper and Tom Hanks. Eyman suggested that Stewart could portray several different characters: "the brother, the sweetheart, [and] the nice guy next door with a bias toward doing the right thing: always decent but never a pushover". In Stewart's early career, Louella Parsons described his "boyish appeal" and "ability to win audience sympathy" as the reasons for his success as an actor; Stewart's performances appealed to both young and old audiences. According to film scholar Dennis Bingham, Stewart's essential persona was, "a small-town friendly neighbor, with a gentle face and voice and a slim body that is at once graceful and awkward." Unlike many actors who developed their on-screen persona over time, Stewart's on-screen persona was recognizable as early as Art Trouble (1934), his uncredited debut film role, where Stewart was relaxed and comfortable on-screen. He portrayed this persona most strongly in the 1940s, but maintained a classic everyman persona throughout his career.

Film scholar Dennis Bingham wrote that Stewart was "both a 'personality' star and a chameleon" who evoked both masculine and feminine qualities. Consequently, it was difficult for filmmakers to sell Stewart as the stereotypical leading man, and thus he "became a star in films that capitalized on his sexual ambivalence." Stewart's asexual persona as a leading man was unusual for the time period for an actor who was not mainly a comedian. However, during his career "Stewart [encompassed] the furthest extremes of American masculinity, from Reaganite militarist patriotism to Hitchcockian perversity."

According to Roger Ebert, Stewart's pre-World War II characters were usually likable, but in postwar years directors chose to cast Stewart in darker roles, such as Jeffries in Rear Window. Ebert put this into contemporary perspective by asking, "What would it feel like to see [Tom Hanks] in a bizarre and twisted light?", explaining that it is jarring to see a beloved everyman persona such as Stewart in dark roles. Furthermore, Jonathan Rosenbaum explained that since audiences were primarily interested in Stewart's "star persona" and "aura" than his characters, "this makes it more striking when Anthony Mann and Alfred Hitchcock periodically explore the neurotic and obsessive aspects of Stewart's persona to play against his all-American innocence and earnestness."

Film scholar John Belton argued that rather than playing characters in his films, Stewart often played his own screen persona. He had difficulty playing famous historical personages because his persona could not accommodate the historical character. Belton explained that "James Stewart is more James Stewart than Glenn Miller in The Glenn Miller Story (1954) or Charles Lindbergh in The Spirit of St. Louis (1957)." Moreover, Jonathan Rosenbaum continued that Stewart's "pre-existing life-size persona" in Winchester '73 "helped to shape and determine the impact of [his character] in [this film]." 
On the other hand, Stewart has been described as a character actor who went through several distinct career phases. According to film scholar Amy Lawrence, the main elements of Stewart's persona, "a propensity for physical and spiritual suffering, lingering fears of inadequacy," were established by Frank Capra in the 1930s and were enhanced through his later work with Hitchcock and Mann. John Belton explained that "James Stewart evolves from the naive, small-town, populist hero of Frank Capra's 1930s comedies to the bitter, anxiety-ridden, vengeance-obsessed cowboy in Anthony Mann's 1950s Westerns and the disturbed voyeur and sexual fetishist in Alfred Hitchcock's 1950s suspense thrillers." During his postwar career, Stewart usually avoided appearing in comedies, Harvey and Take Her, She's Mine being exceptions. He played many different types of characters, including manipulative, cynical, obsessive, or crazy characters. Stewart found that acting allowed him to express the fear and anxiety that he could not express during the war; his post-war performances were received well by audiences because audiences could still see the innocent, pre-war Stewart underneath his dark roles. According to Andrew Sarris, Stewart was "the most complete actor-personality in the American cinema."

Work

Filmography

Selected credits:

Theatre

Radio

Legacy

Stewart is remembered for portraying idealist "everyman" characters in his films. His heroism on-screen and devotion to his family made him relatable and representative of the American ideal, leading Stewart to be considered one of the best-loved figures in twentieth-century American popular culture. According to film scholar Dennis Bingham, "his ability to 'play'—even symbolize—honesty and 'American ideals' made him an icon into whose mold later male stars tried to pour themselves." Similarly, film scholar James Naremore has called Stewart "the most successful actor of the 'common man' in the history of movies" and "the most intensely-emotional leading man to emerge from the studio system," who could cry on screen without losing his masculinity. David Thomson has explained Stewart's appeal by stating that "we wanted to be him, and we wanted to be liked by him," while Roger Ebert has stated that "whether he played everyman, or everyman's hidden psyche, Stewart was an innately likable man whose face, loping gait and distinctive drawl became famous all over the world." Among Stewart's most recognizable qualities was his manner of speaking with a hesitant drawl. According to film scholar Tim Palmer, "Stewart's legacy rests on his roles as the nervous idealist standing trial for, and gaining stature from, the sincerity of his beliefs, while his emotive convictions are put to the test." Film critic David Ansen wrote about Stewart's appeal as a person in addition to his appeal as an actor. Ansen retold a story in which Jack Warner, upon being told about Ronald Reagan's presidential ambitions, said, "No. Jimmy Stewart for president, Ronald Reagan for best friend." Ansen further explained that Stewart was the ultimate trustworthy movie star.

In contrast to his popularly remembered "all-American" screen persona, film critics and scholars have tended to emphasize that his performances also often showed a "dark side". According to film scholar Murray Pomerance, "the other Jimmy Stewart ... was a different type altogether, a repressed and neurotic man buried beneath an apparently calm facade, but ready at any moment to explode with vengeful anxiety and anger, or else with deeply twisted and constrained passions that could never match up with cheery personality of the alter ego." Bingham has described him as having "two coequal personas; the earnest idealist, the nostalgic figure of the homespun boy next door; and the risk-taking actor who probably performed in films for more canonical auteurs than any other American star." According to him, it is this complexity and his ambiguous masculinity and sexuality with which he approached his roles that characterized his persona. Naremore has stated that there was a "troubled, cranky, slightly-repressed feeling in [Stewart's] behavior", and Thomson has written that it was his dark side that produced "great cinema".

Stewart was one of the most sought-after actors in 1950s Hollywood, proving that independent actors could be successful in the film industry, which led more actors in Hollywood to forego studio contracts. According to Bingham, Stewart marked "the transition between the studio period...and the era of free-lance actors, independent production, and powerful talent agents that made possible the "new kind of star" of the late 1960s." Although Stewart was not the first big-name freelance actor, his "mythic sweetness and idealism [which] were combined with eccentric physical equipment and capacity as an actor to enact emotion, anxiety, and pain" enabled him to succeed in both the studio system, which emphasized the star as a real person, and the skeptical post-studio era.

A number of Stewart's films have become classics of American cinema, with twelve of his films having been inducted into the United States National Film Registry as of 2019, and five —Mr. Smith Goes to Washington (1939), The Philadelphia Story (1940), It's a Wonderful Life (1946), Rear Window (1954), and Vertigo (1958)— being featured on the American Film Institute's list of the 100 greatest American films of all time. Stewart and Robert DeNiro share the title for the most films represented on the AFI list. Stewart is also the most represented leading actor on the "100 Greatest Movies of All Time" list presented by Entertainment Weekly. Two of his characters —Jefferson Smith in Mr. Smith Goes to Washington (1939) and George Bailey in It's a Wonderful Life (1946)— made AFI's list of the one hundred greatest heroes and villains, and Harvey (1950) and The Philadelphia Story (1940) were included in their list of Greatest American Comedies. In 1999, the American Film Institute (AFI) ranked Stewart third on its list of the greatest American male actors.

Memorials 
Stewart has several memorials in his childhood hometown, Indiana, Pennsylvania. On May 20, 1995, his 87th birthday, The Jimmy Stewart Museum was established there. The museum is located near his birthplace, his childhood home and the former location of his father's hardware store. According to biographer Gary Fishgall, some residents of Indiana were angered by the creation of the museum; they believed he had contributed nothing to the town aside from growing up there. The museum committee insisted that Stewart had contributed significant donations to the town, but it was done quietly so it was unknown to most residents. A large statue of Stewart stands on the lawn of the Indiana County Courthouse and a plaque marks his birthplace. In 2011, the United States Post Office located at 47 South 7th Street in Indiana, Pennsylvania, was designated the "James M. 'Jimmy' Stewart Post Office Building." Additionally, the Indiana County–Jimmy Stewart Airport was named in his honor.

Honors 

In 1960, Stewart was awarded a star on the Hollywood Walk of Fame at 1700 Vine Street for his contributions to the film industry. In 1974, he received the Golden Plate Award of the American Academy of Achievement. His Golden Plate was presented by Awards Council member Helen Hayes. In 1997, Princeton University, Stewart's alma mater, honored him with the dedication of the James M. Stewart Theater along with a retrospective of his films. Stewart has also been honored with his own postal stamp as part of the "Legends of Hollywood" stamp series. In 1999, a bust of Stewart was unveiled at the Eighth Air Force Heritage Museum in Georgia. The L. Tom Perry Special Collections Library at Brigham Young University houses his personal papers and movie memorabilia including letters, scrapbooks, recordings of early radio programs and two of his accordions. Stewart donated his papers and memorabilia to the library after becoming friends with the curator of its arts and communications collections, James D'Arc.

Documentary 
 2017 : James Stewart/Robert Mitchum: The Two Faces of America directed by Gregory Monro

References

Notes

Citations

Bibliography

 
 Beaver, Jim. "James Stewart." Films in Review, October 1980.

 Collins, Thomas W. Jr."Stewart, James" . American National Biography Online. Retrieved February 18, 2007.

 Houghton, Norris. But Not Forgotten: The Adventure of the University Players. New York: William Sloane Associates, 1951.

 Jackson, Kenneth T., Karen Markoe and Arnie Markoe. The Scribner Encyclopedia of American Lives (5). New York: Simon and Schuster, 1998. .

 
 
 Prendergast, Tom and Sara, eds. "Stewart, James." International Dictionary of Films and Filmmakers, 4th edition. London: St. James Press, 2000. .
 Prendergast, Tom and Sara, eds. "Stewart, James." St. James Encyclopedia of Popular Culture, 5th edition. London: St. James Press, 2000. .

 Wright, Stuart J. An Emotional Gauntlet: From Life in Peacetime America to the War in European Skies—A History of 453rd Bomb Group Crews. Milwaukee, Wisconsin: University of Wisconsin Press, 2004. .

External links
 
 
 
 
 Jimmy Stewart Museum
 James Stewart interview on BBC Radio 4 Desert Island Discs, December 23, 1983
 Collections related to James Stewart at the L. Tom Perry Special Collections, Harold B. Lee Library, Brigham Young University 

1908 births
1997 deaths
20th-century American male actors
20th-century American male writers
20th-century American poets
20th-century Presbyterians
AFI Life Achievement Award recipients
Academy Honorary Award recipients
American Presbyterians
American male film actors
American male poets
American male radio actors
American male stage actors
American male television actors
American male voice actors
American people of Scotch-Irish descent
American people of Scottish descent
Articles containing video clips
Best Actor Academy Award winners
Best Drama Actor Golden Globe (television) winners
Burials at Forest Lawn Memorial Park (Glendale)
California Republicans
Cecil B. DeMille Award Golden Globe winners
Commercial aviators
Deaths from pulmonary embolism
Honorary Golden Bear recipients
Kennedy Center honorees
Male Western (genre) film actors
Male actors from Beverly Hills, California
Male actors from Pennsylvania
Mercersburg Academy alumni
Metro-Goldwyn-Mayer contract players
Military personnel from Pennsylvania
Pennsylvania Republicans
People from Indiana, Pennsylvania
Presidential Medal of Freedom recipients
Princeton University School of Architecture alumni
RCA Victor artists
Recipients of the Air Force Distinguished Service Medal
Recipients of the Air Medal
Recipients of the Croix de Guerre 1939–1945 (France)
Recipients of the Distinguished Flying Cross (United States)
Screen Actors Guild Life Achievement Award
Silver Bear for Best Actor winners
United States Air Force generals
United States Air Force personnel of the Vietnam War
United States Air Force reservists
United States Army Air Forces officers
United States Army Air Forces pilots of World War II
Universal Pictures contract players
Volpi Cup for Best Actor winners
Harold B. Lee Library-related film articles
United Service Organizations entertainers
Conservatism in the United States